is a Japanese comedian, tarento and actor. He is represented with Office Kitano. From 1992 to 2007, he acted as a Boke of the comedy duo Jordans with Masaya Yamazaki.

A former highschool amateur wrestler, Mimata has been a host to professional wrestling and combat sports shows. He has worked as a color commentator in shootboxing events, WWE tours and Pro Wrestling Zero1. On May 24, 2018, Mimata debuted as a professional wrestler in an "Electric Current Blast Death Match" in Zero1, wrestling against Taru in a losing effort.

Filmography

Entertainment shows

Tokyo Broadcasting System

Nippon TV

TV Asahi

Fuji Television

TV Tokyo

Others

TV dramas

Radio

Films

Advertisements

Music videos

Internet

VHS/DVD

References

Notes

Annotations

External links
 (blog) 
 
Magic Factory Stage Production Department 
 – Office Kitano 
 – bar that he produced 

Japanese television personalities
Japanese male actors
Japanese impressionists (entertainers)
People from Hanamaki, Iwate
1967 births
Living people